In molecular biology, glycoside hydrolase family 3 is a family of glycoside hydrolases. Glycoside hydrolases  are a widespread group of enzymes that hydrolyse the glycosidic bond between two or more carbohydrates, or between a carbohydrate and a non-carbohydrate moiety. A classification system for glycoside hydrolases, based on sequence similarity, has led to the definition of over 100 different families. This classification is available on the CAZy web site, and also discussed at CAZypedia, an online encyclopedia of carbohydrate active enzymes.

Glycoside hydrolase family 3 CAZY GH_3 comprises enzymes with a number of known activities; beta-glucosidase (EC 3.2.1.21); beta-xylosidase; N-acetyl beta-glucosaminidase (EC 3.2.1.52); glucan beta-1,3-glucosidase; cellodextrinase; exo-1,3-1,4-glucanase. These enzymes are two-domain globular proteins that are N-glycosylated at three sites.

External links 
 GH3 in CAZypedia

References 

EC 3.2.1
GH family
Protein families